Gerald Colville Seymour Curtis, OBE  was High Sheriff of Essex from 1973 to 1974.

The son of Sir George Curtis,  he was an administrator in the Indian Civil Service. In 1935 he married Decima Pryor at Bishops Stortford.

References

High Sheriffs of Essex
Officers of the Order of the British Empire